Matt Thompson (born in Roseville, California on 19 May 1984), is an American film director, producer, screenwriter and actor. He also directed some music videos and commercials and acted on stage productions.

Born to Tim and Cindy Thompson, he grew up in Sacramento, California and graduated from Granite Bay High School, starting his acting debut at 18 and has appeared in many movies since. In 2009 he made his feature directorial debut with the feature film Listen to Your Heart (2010 film) starring Cybill Shepherd, Kent Moran, Alexia Rasmussen and Ernie Sabella. He also played lead role of Stanley Kowalski in the stage presentation of A Streetcar Named Desire. He was named as one of 15 people to watch early in their careers by Sacramento Magazine in its March 2010 cover story.

Filmography

Director
2005: Fallen Soldier (short film)
2010: Listen to Your Heart
2011: Two to Tango (as associate editor)
2011: Bloodline

Producer
2005: Fallen Soldier (short film)
2010: Phase Two (associate producer)
2011: Bloodline

Editor
2011: Bloodline

Actor
2005: Fallen Soldier as Jeff Evans (short)
2007: 7eventy 5ive (aka Dead Tone) as Matthew
2007: Women on Death Row 2 as Steve (TV documentary)
2008: The Hustle as Paramedic
2009: Stamped! as Cody
2009: Sensored as Marcus
2010: Phase Two as Jim Fields
2010: Smosh (TV series) in episode "Ian Gets Lucky" as Jock
2011: Two to Tango as Neil (short)
2011: Bloodline (2011 film) as Brett Ethos

References

External links

American male actors
People from Roseville, California
Living people
1984 births
Film directors from California